Zanclus (Ancient Greek: Ζάγκλος) is the legendary first king of the Sicilian city of Messina. He is mentioned in an etiological passage by Diodorus of Sicily, and has become a symbol of Messina. In modern Italian, the form is given as Zanclo.

Gegenus is recorded as the father of Zanclus. Diodorus writes of Zanclus as the supposed eponym of "Zancle" (the ancient name for Messina). The giant Orion is said to have helped Zanclus in building the city and the harbor.

Zanclus has been identified with the male "Grifone" figure of Messina's traditional Mata e Grifone procession. The earliest records, by Francesco Maurolico, record only one the male figure, and associate it with Zanclus. When Zanclus is identified with the male figure in modern times, his female partner is identified as the Titaness Rhea.

Stephanus of Byzantium also wrote about Zanclus, stating that Zancle could have been named either after him or the well Ζάγκλη.

Notes

References 

 Diodorus Siculus, The Library of History translated by Charles Henry Oldfather. Twelve volumes. Loeb Classical Library. Cambridge, Massachusetts: Harvard University Press; London: William Heinemann, Ltd. 1989. Vol. 3. Books 4.59–8. Online version at Bill Thayer's Web Site
 Diodorus Siculus, Bibliotheca Historica. Vol 1-2. Immanel Bekker. Ludwig Dindorf. Friedrich Vogel. in aedibus B. G. Teubneri. Leipzig. 1888-1890. Greek text available at the Perseus Digital Library.
 Stephanus of Byzantium, Stephani Byzantii Ethnicorum quae supersunt, edited by August Meineike (1790-1870), published 1849. A few entries from this important ancient handbook of place names have been translated by Brady Kiesling. Online version at the Topos Text Project.

Sicilian characters in Greek mythology